Rosendal is the administrative centre of the municipality of Kvinnherad in Vestland county, Norway. The village is especially known for the Barony Rosendal, a historic estate located in the village. Kvinnherad Church is also located in this village.

The economy of the village is centered on agriculture, ship building, and tourism. The shipbuilder Skaalurens Skibsbyggeri was established in Rosendal in 1855.

The newspaper Grenda is published in Rosendal.

References

External links 
 

Villages in Vestland
Kvinnherad